Tour de France (in some markets titled French Tour) is a 2016 French drama film directed by Rachid Djaïdani. It was screened in the Directors' Fortnight section at the 2016 Cannes Film Festival.

Cast
 Gérard Depardieu as Serge Desmoulins
 Sadek as Far'Hook
 Louise Grinberg as Maude

References

External links
 

2016 films
2016 drama films
French drama films
2010s French-language films
2010s French films